Annica Edstam (born 22 March 1969) in Stockholm, is a Swedish actress and singer.

Key theatre credits

Discography 
 1996 Les Misérables

Notes

References 
 ANNICA EDSTAM on malmoopera.se  
 I afton: Lola Blau
 ANNICA EDSTAM on smot.se
 Annika Edstam gör Belle i Skönheten och Odjuret

External links 
Annica Edstams' blog
Annica Edstams official website

1969 births
Living people
Swedish stage actresses
Swedish women singers
Swedish musical theatre actresses